Heliograph is a word derived from helios (Greek Ἥλιος / ἥλιος "sun") and graphein (γραφειν "to write"). It has several uses:
 the heliograph, a device used for optical signalling
 a type of sunshine recorder
 a solar telescope, a telescope especially adapted for viewing the surface of the sun
 heliography, the photographic process used to make the earliest known permanent photograph from nature